John Kissel (July 31, 1864, in Brooklyn, Kings County, New York – October 3, 1938, in Brooklyn, New York City) was an American newspaper publisher and politician from New York.

Life
He attended public and private schools, and served as a clerk in the Brooklyn Navy Yard. He learned the printing trade and published the Kings County Republican from 1889 to 1914.  Kissel became a member of the New York State Republican Committee in 1886; was Clerk to the Board of Supervisors of Kings County in 1894 and 1895; and engaged in the brewery business.

Kissel was a presidential elector in 1900.

He was a member of the New York State Senate (9th D.) in 1909 and 1910; and organized, and for fifteen years conducted at his own expense, the first free labor bureau in the United States, which was subsequently merged into the United States Employment Service.

He was elected as a Republican to the 67th United States Congress, holding office from March 4, 1921, to March 3, 1923. Afterwards he became a general tax consultant with offices in Brooklyn, and was employed as an attendant at the Empire State Building.

He died on October 3, 1938, in Brooklyn, and was buried at the Lutheran Cemetery in Glendale, Queens.

References

1864 births
1938 deaths
Politicians from Brooklyn
Republican Party New York (state) state senators
Republican Party members of the United States House of Representatives from New York (state)
1900 United States presidential electors